Pearl Tan is an Australian television and film actress, writer, director and producer. She is most well known for her role on Sea Patrol as Federal Agent Alicia Turnbull, a role she had during the series' first season.

In 2009. she was awarded an Associate Mike Walsh Fellowship.

References

External links 
 

Living people
Australian television actresses
Australian film actresses
Year of birth missing (living people)